Star Circle Quest (season 1) premiered on March 1, 2004 on ABS-CBN. The show was hosted by Luis Manzano and Jodi Sta. Maria. The jury is composed of Boy Abunda, Gloria Diaz and Laurenti Dyogi.

History
In 2004, ABS-CBN Talent Center had already produced 11 Star Circle batches which are composed of more than 200 stars. By that year, the talent center is having its audition for Star Circle Batch 12. But after seeing the huge profits that ‘idols’ could rake in, Star Circle changed course and took its new format. From the untelevised regular talent search, Star Circle became a reality-based talent search named as Star Circle Quest or SCQ for short.

The show was then hosted by Luis Manzano and Jodi Sta. Maria, while the jury is composed of Boy Abunda, an entertainment writer, TV host and talent manager; Gloria Diaz, an actress and former beauty queen; and Lauren Dyogi, TV director and writer.

From an estimated 10 thousands who auditioned, 10 lucky hopefuls made it to the Final 10 or called as the Magic Circle of 10, which is composed of Hero Angeles, Sandara Park, Joross Gamboa, Roxanne Guinoo, Melissa Ricks, Neri Naig, Errol Abalayan, Michelle Madrigal, Joseph Bitangcol and Raphael Martinez.

Grand Questors Night
The Grand Questor's night was held in Araneta Coliseum on June 5, 2004. While the Star Circle Kid Quest was held first, the Star Circle Teen Quest started around 9:30 PM. In the Grand Questor's Night, the final five questors shows their talents in acting, singing or dancing to impress the people and the judges to give them a higher score.

Sandara Park won again the Voter's choice award but this didn't help her to become the Grand Questor. Hero Angeles became the Grand Questor by adding the voter's choice and his score from the judges. Roxanne Guinoo won the third place, Joross Gamboa was in the fourth place and Melissa Ricks was in the fifth place.

Elimination chart

The four runners-up were announced in no particular order. None of the runners-up in the Top 5 placed higher than the rest. Sandara Park was called last merely to prolong the intrigue and give anticipation that she won the competition, since she was the fan favorite.

External links
 Star Circle Quest Official Website
 The Star Circle Quest Community

References

 
2004 Philippine television seasons